Emerson Hospital is a hospital located in Concord, Massachusetts, at 133 Old Road to Nine Acre Corner, founded in 1911 on  donated by Charles Emerson, a nephew of Ralph Waldo Emerson. It is a full-service, non-profit community hospital and acute care medical center with (as of 2006) 177 beds, providing advanced medical services to over 300,000 individuals in 25 towns.

History
Emerson's wife died on December 7, 1910.  The Concord Enterprise, on December 18, "provided details that a gift of land and money had been given to the New England Deaconess Association. The article stated, “The gift comes through Mr. Emerson, whose wife was recently as inmate of the Brookline hospital, and who made an offer to the institution before her death which recently occurred ... the hospital will be known as the Concord hospital and will be run on much the same principles as the Deaconess Hospital in Longwood, where patients who cannot afford to pay are taken free, and those who are able to pay do so."

When the hospital opened in 1911, The Concord Enterprise reporter who had toured the facility wrote "The hospital building was two-stories tall with basement constructed in the Colonial style with a gambrel roof. The article stated the hospital was constructed using terra cotta tiles with concrete facing. One entered the vestibule of the hospital through swinging doors. Walls were pale green with “natural finished birch woodwork.” From the vestibule, one entered the main hospital. “Upon entering the main hall one’s eye is instantly attracted by a picture on the wall at the right. This picture, which is of Mrs. Charles Emerson, the gift of Mr. Emerson, is a painting by William James, son of the late Prof. James of Harvard.”"

Facing financial difficulties, in October 1924, what had been known as the Deaconess Hospital incorporated in Concord with the name Emerson Hospital.  The newly named hospital opened in November and the first admission was an eight-year-old boy with appendicitis.

In 1934, "the rates for a bed on the ward were billed at $3.50 per day, with the cost of a private room increasing to $4.25. Rates for maternity were greater, ranging from $4.00 to $6.50 for a private room per day. The hospital charged $10.00 for the delivery of a baby. Charges for use of the operating room were $5.00 plus $5.00 for anesthesia for minor cases and $10.00 plus $5.00 for anesthesia for major surgical cases. The removal of tonsils cost $9.50 while any treatment requiring the use of dressings ranged in fees from $2.00 to $5.00. Even at these rates, many patients could not afford the services they received while a patient at Emerson. The laboratory charged fees ranging from $1.00 to $5.00."

In 1962, Steve Carell, an American actor, comedian, producer, writer, and director well known for portraying Michael Scott in TV show, The Office, was born in Emerson Hospital.

In 1982, the Board of Directors "voted to create a parent corporation, Emerson Health System, Inc. As the Chairman of the Board wrote in the 1982 annual report, the new corporation was “to provide a conceptual framework for development of a more comprehensive health system and a legal structure in which small, potentially revenue producing corporations could be formed free from state-regulated budget constraints.”114  Emerson Health System Inc. is a not-for-profit corporation organized under Massachusetts law and is tax exempt under the Internal Revenue Code Section 501(c)(3). Emerson Health System Inc. is the sole member of Emerson Hospital and elects the Board of Directors of the Hospital. Emerson Hospital is also a not-for-profit corporation."

Clinical affiliations
Massachusetts General Hospital:  Radiation Oncology, Genetic counseling through MGH's Center for Cancer Risk Assessment, Pediatric affiliations in Neonatology and Pediatric Subspecialties including Gastroenterology and Cardiology 
Dana Farber/Partners Cancer Care:  Collaborative program for cancer care, including clinical trials 
Brigham & Women's:  Gynecological Oncology 
Beth Israel Deaconess:  Perinatology 
Reproductive Science Center:  Infertility

References

Hospitals in Middlesex County, Massachusetts
Buildings and structures in Concord, Massachusetts